Oporto British School (OBS) is a British school established in 1894 in Foz do Douro, Porto, Portugal. It is the oldest British school in mainland Europe.

It is a private, day school for both boys and girls, aged 3 to 18, with 558 pupils on roll. It follows a British curriculum until the completion of the IGCSE.

Senior pupils then study the IB Diploma Programme and many go on to higher education in the UK, Portugal, and other locations around the world.

Accreditation
OBS received CIS Accreditation in 2005. It is a member of the European Council of International Schools, the Council of British International Schools.

Houses
OBS has three houses named after prominent royal houses:
House of Windsor
House of Braganza
House of Lancaster

History
The Oporto British School opened in 1894 with 11 boys, with the Rev WS Picken MA as the Master. The School house, in the Porto suburb Foz do Douro, was rented at the time but was purchased in 1922 and remains part of the school's facilities. Non-British boys were accepted in 1902, and girls in 1914. Pupil numbers remained small, and it was not until well after the Second World War that the roll exceeded 100.

Picken became Chaplain of St James' Church, Porto in 1899, and the chaplains of the church were headmasters of the school until 1939.
 
The school, founded as a Prep School, continued as such until the mid-1950s, when some pupils remained to take their GCE examinations. The early 1960s saw a further development in provision for Portuguese pupils, as the school ensured that, in addition to following an English curriculum, a parallel course in Portuguese was also followed.
 
Growing pupil numbers through the 1970s and into the 1980s meant that a significant building programme was required to provide the accommodation and facilities for in excess of 200 pupils. A curriculum for post-IGCSE pupils was developed in the early 1990s with the provision of courses leading to the award of the International Baccalaureate Diploma Programme. By this time, the proportion of pupils from a Portuguese background exceeded that of all others, including British students. This trend continued, and there are in excess of 550 pupils in the school, 50% of whom are from Portuguese families, 10% are British, and 40% from other backgrounds.
 
Along with recent growth in pupils numbers has been significant curriculum and campus development. The school achieved fully accredited status by the Council of International Schools.

Leadership and management
The school is run by an elected board of governors (chairman of the board Nick Heath) and the Senior Leadership Team include: Headmaster: Nick Sellers, Head of Primary: Stacey Howard, Head of Secondary: Chris Payne, Head of Co-Curriculum and Accreditation Coordinator: Jonathan Bridges, and the Business Manager: Marta Luiz. 

The school has a Student Council who represent the pupil body at public and ceremonial events.

The school has a Parent-Teacher Association (The President of the Parents Association is the Headmaster and the current Chair of the PTA is Neil Charles).

Location
The school is in the suburb of Foz do Douro in Rua da Cerca, Porto, Portugal.

Sports, initiatives and extra-curricular activities

Oporto British School has a range of sports. Traditionally, the main school sports have been football and basketball. The school's sport colours are blue and white. The school participates in school competitions annually and term-by-term.

The school received Green Flag status on 29 September 2009 for environmentally friendly practice.

The school participates in many national and international trips annually of sporting, charitable and cultural significance. These include:
IB CAS students participate in trips to help communities in Tanzania, India, Mozambique and São Tomé e Príncipe.
Model UN trips to Budapest, Belém, Lisbon, and Paris
Science trips to Sierra de Gredos
Multi-school sports festival (basketball & football) in Cascais, Lisbon and since 2022 Sports trips top Verona and a Ski trip to La Molina.

References

External links 

Oporto British School
School Profile on IBO website

British international schools in Europe
Educational institutions established in 1894
International Baccalaureate schools in Portugal
International schools in Porto
1894 establishments in Portugal